Goleh Jar (also Romanized as Goleh Jār, Galeh Jār, Geleh Jār; also known as Geleh Chār, Goljār, Gol Jār, Golzār, Gūl-ī-Zār, and Kaljār) is a village in Arkavazi Rural District, Chavar District, Ilam County, Ilam Province, Iran. At the 2006 census, its population was 301, in 61 families. The village is populated by Kurds.

References 

Populated places in Ilam County
Kurdish settlements in Ilam Province